Magor Marsh is a  wetland reserve, located on the Welsh side of the Severn Estuary. It is managed by the Gwent Wildlife Trust. It has a great variety of habitats, including damp hay meadows, sedge fen, reed bed, scrub and wet woodland. There are also numerous reens and a large pond.

Magor Marsh Nature Reserve is the richest site in Wales for wetland beetles and soldier-flies, and its pattern of drainage ditches and other features have remained unchanged since the 14th century.

In March 2020 the reserve was featured in the BBC One programme Countryfile.

Geology
Beneath this is alluvium laid down by the Severn Estuary. The level of water must be kept near the surface to preserve the peat.

Wildlife

Flora
There are two hay meadows in Magor Marsh, maintained using traditional methods. The meadows are grazed during autumn and winter. The hay crop is mown in mid-summer to provide winter feed. By late spring the fields are a mass of flowers. In the meadows are such species as lady's smock, ragged robin, yellow flag, lesser spearwort and meadow thistle. The common species in the reeds are teasel, common reed, hemp agrimony and purple loosestrife. In the reen grow water horsetail, reedmace, marsh marigold and azure damselfly. Osier, crack willow and sallow are typical tree species in the wet woodland.

Fauna
Magor Marsh includes breeding grounds for common redshank and common snipe. Reed warbler, grasshopper warbler, cetti's warbler, reed bunting and chiffchaff also live in the reeds. In the pond are water rail, coot, grey heron, little grebe, moorhen, little egret, Eurasian teal, shoveler and kingfisher. In the reen the most common species are grass snake, great silver beetle, smooth newt and otter. The wet woodland typical has such species as great spotted woodpecker and musk beetle. Cuckoo can be heard in the summer. Osier, crack willow and sallow are typical species in the wet woodland. In the meadows the common butterflies are orange tip and meadow brown. The reens provide a habitat for azure damselfly. In 2019 leaf mines and a larva of the marbled marble (Celypha woodiana) was found on mistletoe (Viscum album), this Biodiversity Action Plan (UK BAP) species has a limited distribution in Britain and the 2019 record was the first confirmed for Wales.

The European water vole can be found within the reserve.

Gallery

References

Sites of Special Scientific Interest in Monmouthshire
Marshes of Wales
Nature reserves in Monmouthshire
Protected areas established in 1963
Wetlands of Monmouthshire